"Digital Love" is a single by electropop songwriter and record producer Digital Farm Animals, featuring vocals from American actress and singer Hailee Steinfeld. It was released on 3 February 2017, through Tim & Danny Music.

Charts

References

2017 songs
2017 singles
Digital Farm Animals songs
Hailee Steinfeld songs
Songs written by Cutfather
Songs written by Daniel Davidsen
Songs written by Digital Farm Animals
Song recordings produced by Digital Farm Animals